The 2008 National Pro Fastpitch season was the fifth season of professional softball under the name National Pro Fastpitch (NPF) for  the only professional women's fastpitch softball league in the United States.  From 1997 to 2002, NPF operated under the names Women's Pro Fastpitch (WPF) and Women's Pro Softball League (WPSL).  Each year, the playoff teams battle for the Cowles Cup.

Teams, cities and stadiums

Milestones and events
The Chicago Bandits started their first season in Elgin, Illinois at Judson University.  The original plans were for the Bandits to play at Judson temporarily while a potential $5 million softball stadium was built nearby.  Those plans did not come to fruition, and the Bandits eventually moved to a new ballpark in Rosemont, Illinois for 2011.

Team NPF and Bound-4-Beijing Tour 
As part of the USA Softball Team Bound 4 Beijing Tour in preparation for the 2008 Olympics, two games were scheduled between the US Olympic softball team and a team of NPF All-Stars.  The announced roster for Team NPF was:

NPF veterans  Monica Abbott, Cat Osterman, Kelly Kretschman, Vicky Galindo and Jennie Finch were on the Olympic team roster.
Team NPF was coached by Oklahoma head softball coach Patty Gasso and private instructor Cindy Bristow.  Bristow was head coach and assistant general manager of the Georgia Pride, which later became the Florida Wahoos, a team in the WPSL.

The Olympic team beat Team NPF in both games, on June 6 by a score of 10-8 and on June 14 by a score of 6-0.

On the same tour, the US Olympic team beat the Washington Glory 2-0 on May 10, and beat the Akron Racers 6-2 on July 22.

Player acquisition

College draft

The 2008 NPF Senior Draft was held February 18, 2008 via conference call.  First-Team All-American pitcher Katie Burkhart of Arizona State was selected first by the Philadelphia Force.

Notable transactions

League standings 
Source 

In each NPF team's 48-game schedule were games against international teams, which counted in the standings.  Chinese Taipei, Venezuela, Canada and the Netherlands each played at least two series against NPF teams.

NPF Championship

The 2008 NPF Championship Series was held at Sunset Point Park in Kimberly, Wisconsin August 21-4.  The top four teams qualified and were seeded based on the final standings.  The series matched the teams up in a double-elimination bracket.

Annual awards
Source:

See also

 List of professional sports leagues
 List of professional sports teams in the United States and Canada

References

External links 
 

Softball teams
Nat
Softball in the United States
2008 in American women's sports